Jamie Mankelow (born 4 September 1964) is an English former professional footballer who played in the Football League as a forward.

References

1964 births
Living people
People from Upper Clapton
English footballers
Association football forwards
Leyton Orient F.C. players
Walthamstow Avenue F.C. players
Epping Town F.C. players
English Football League players